The Agua Nueva Formation is a geologic formation in Mexico. It preserves fossils dating back to the upper part of the Cenomanian stage of the Cretaceous period. It consists "predominantly of alternating fossiliferous, organic matter-rich, laminated, dark gray limestone and non-laminated, organic matter-poor limestone in decimeter-thick beds (10 to 30 cm) with occasional centimetric beds (5 cm) of brown shale that show no apparent internal structures." The formation is noted for its qualities as a Konservat-Lagerstätte,  with notable finds including the plesiosaur Mauriciosaurus and shark Aquilolamna.

See also 

 List of fossiliferous stratigraphic units in Mexico

References

External links 
 

Geologic formations of Mexico
Cretaceous Mexico